Grease Your Hips is an unofficial live album by American alternative rock band Hole. The double album is composed of live radio broadcast performances by Hole in 1994 at the Hollywood Palladium and the Berkeley Community Theatre in Berkeley, California, in late 1994. It was released on vinyl on January 22, 2016.

Background
The tracks on Grease Your Hips originate from radio broadcasts of two Hole shows in 1994; first at the Hollywood Palladium in November, and second at the Berkeley Community Theatre in December. The title of the record is derived from a lyric in the track "Gutless."

Release
The album was released initially on iTunes by Good Ship Funke Records, a United Kingdom-based label, on May 4, 2015. It was released as a double LP on January 22, 2016 in the United Kingdom by Let Them Eat Vinyl, and on January 29 in North America.

Track listing

*Note: Tracks 1-11 recorded at the Hollywood Palladium, November 9, 1994; Tracks 12-19 recorded at the Berkeley Community Theatre, December 9, 1994

Personnel
Courtney Love - lead vocals, rhythm guitar
Eric Erlandson - lead guitar
Melissa Auf der Maur - bass, backing vocals
Patty Schemel - drums

References

2016 live albums
Hole (band) albums